The Soles de Sonora (English: "Sonora Suns") are a Mexican professional indoor soccer franchise based in Hermosillo, capital city of the northwestern state of Sonora. Founded in October 2014, the team made its debut in the Major Arena Soccer League with the 2015–16 season. The team is also a member of the Liga Mexicana de Fútbol Rápido Profesional (LMFR-Pro).

The franchise is owned by a group led by Rogelio Enrique Cota Gutierrez.  The team plays its home games at the Centro de Usos Múltiples, an 8,600-seat arena in Hermosillo.

Personnel
As of May 22, 2020.

Active players

References

External links
Soles de Sonora official website
El Centro de Usos Múltiples official website
Major Arena Soccer League official website

2014 establishments in Mexico
Association football clubs established in 2014
Major Arena Soccer League teams
Mexican indoor football teams
Football clubs in Sonora
Sport in Hermosillo